"Happy Gun" is New Zealand band Stellar*'s first single, and their indies release. Though Chris Van de Geer was not a part of the band at this point he mixed the title track. This indies release sees the band in a completely different genre than what their standard releases are like, featuring a heavy grunge rock arrangement for the first two tracks and an acoustic rock sound for the third. The B-side "Ride" appears in a short film called Headlong by Simon Raby.

Track listing

References

Stellar (New Zealand band) songs
1996 singles
1996 songs
Songs written by Boh Runga